Heinz Ulrik de Boer is a South African journalist and politician who has been a Member of the KwaZulu-Natal Legislature since May 2019. A member of the Democratic Alliance, he was previously the ward councillor for Umhlanga in the eThekwini Metropolitan Municipality.

Career
De Boer worked for Daily News until May 2009, when he resigned to contest a by-election in Umhlanga as the Democratic Alliance candidate. He won the by-election in June 2009. He won a full term in 2011 and was re-elected in 2016.

On 20 March 2018, he was elected deputy caucus leader of the DA. He resigned from the post on 3 April 2018 after serving less than two weeks.

Following the 2019 provincial election, he was promoted to the KwaZulu-Natal Legislature. DA caucus leader Zwakele Mncwango appointed him the party's spokesperson on economic development, tourism and environmental affairs.

References

External links

Hon. HU De Boer at KwaZulu-Natal Legislature

Living people
Year of birth missing (living people)
White South African people
People from Durban
Democratic Alliance (South Africa) politicians
Members of the KwaZulu-Natal Legislature
21st-century South African politicians